is a train station located on the Nara Line in Uji, Kyoto Prefecture, Japan, operated by West Japan Railway Company (JR West). This station administrates all intermediate stations on the Nara Line. It has the station number "JR-D09".

Layout
Originally, there was a side platform and an island platform serving three tracks. Both these and the station building were at ground level. The station was rebuilt in 2000 with two island platforms serving four tracks and a new station building designed imitating the Phoenix Hall of Byōdō-in, a major tourist attraction in Uji.

Platforms

History
Station numbering was introduced in March 2018 with Uji being assigned station number JR-D09.

Passenger statistics
According to the Kyoto Prefecture statistical report, the average number of passengers per day is as follows.

Adjacent stations

Surrounding area
Uji City Hall
Byōdō-in
Agata Shrine
Ujigami Shrine
Uji Bridge
Uji Station (Keihan Railway Uji Line)

References

External links

  

Railway stations in Japan opened in 1896
Railway stations in Kyoto Prefecture